is a fictional French boxer from Nintendo's Punch-Out!! video game series. He first appeared in the arcade game Punch-Out!! in 1984 and three years later in the NES game of the same name. His most recent appearance was in the Wii installment of Punch-Out!!. He was originally designed by Shigeru Miyamoto and was revised by Makoto Wada for the NES game. He is voiced by Christian Bernard in the Wii game.

Joe is the player's first opponent in all of his roles. As a foil among most of the boxers, he is famous for his weakness and cowardice, considered by critics to be stereotypes of French people. These characteristics were emphasized by the developer of the Wii game which included cutscenes which depict Glass Joe in French settings. Glass Joe is considered one of the most well-known characters in the Punch-Out!! series and a Nintendo icon. His name has been used to describe poor performance by sportspeople and teams. In the Wii game, his dialogue consists of him pleading for the player to not strike him in the jaw, complaints about the tightness of his gloves, and counting to ten in French.

Concept and creation
Glass Joe is a 38-year-old French flyweight boxer who was born in Paris. He stands at 177.8 centimeters (5'10'') and weighs in at 49.9 kilograms (110 lbs.). His boxing record is one win and 99 losses. He is the weakest opponent and the first meeting with the players in any of their appearances. His mediocrity has been attributed to poor blocking and reaction time. He possesses several stereotypes of French people.

The character was designed by Shigeru Miyamoto for the original Punch-Out!! arcade game. The name "Glass Joe" was conceived by Genyo Takeda as a play on his glass jaw. Glass Joe's appearance was revised by Makoto Wada for the NES Punch-Out!!. The character is voiced by Christian Bernard in the Wii game; much of his dialogue in between matches consists of counting to ten in French. Next Level Games (the developer of the Wii game) introduced cutscenes which depicted Glass Joe as a fashionable Frenchman. They also showed him in front of the Arc de Triomphe and the Eiffel Tower (both Parisian landmarks) The designers had croissants burst from Glass Joe as he is knocked out.

Appearances
Glass Joe's debut was in the first Punch-Out!! game for the arcades in 1984. His role was to give young players a sense of accomplishment which motivated them to spend more money to try and beat the more difficult opponents. Glass Joe later appeared in Punch-Out!! for the NES in 1987. While he did not appear in the SNES game's sequel, he opened a boxing school for potential fighters. Gabby Jay (the game's first opponent) attended this school and got his first and only win against Glass Joe. Glass Joe's most recent appearance was in Punch-Out!! for the Wii in 2009. He was one of the first characters revealed in pre-release material. The Wii Punch-Out!! has a mode called "Title Defense" which featured a more difficult version of Glass Joe among other opponents. This mode has Glass Joe wear a protective headgear out of a doctor's recommendation after an X-ray was done on his skull, causing him to be immune to jabs unless star-punched.

Reception
Glass Joe has come to be considered one of Punch-Out!!s signature characters. He was included in a series of trading cards which depict various Punch-Out!! boxers. Both UGO's Chris Plante and G4TV's "jmanalang" considered the fight with Glass Joe one of the most memorable NES moments. Plante felt that it was even more memorable than the in-game fight with Mike Tyson. GameDaily's Chris Buffa called Glass Joe one of the most unappreciated Nintendo characters and said that he wanted to see him succeed. Chris Morgan for Yardbarker described Glass Joe as one of "the most memorable characters from old school Nintendo games".

His name has been used as a derogatory term for sportspeople who perform poorly such as Derek Anderson and Ahmad Bradshaw. The name has also been used by ESPN's Bill Simmons to describe his disappointment with the heavyweight championship fight between boxers Wladimir Klitschko and Chris Byrd. When asked who among his boxing opponents most reminded him of Glass Joe, Mike Tyson said Bruce Seldon whom he claimed he didn't even need to hit. Yahoo! Sports' Mike Oz created the "Glass Joe Title" (awarded for poor performance in the MLB). He has so far awarded it to the Los Angeles Angels, the New York Mets, the New York Yankees, and the Atlanta Braves.

Glass Joe's French characteristics have been discussed by critics such as writer Sumantra Lahiri and Eurogamer's Oli Welsh. IGN's Craig Harris felt that the NES game focused more on his weaknesses and that the Wii game emphasized his stereotypes. A member of the Retronauts podcast also felt that he was defined more by his weakness than his nationality until he learned more about French stereotypes. Chris Buffa felt that the stereotypes could be considered offensive while Giant Bomb's Ryan Davis felt that there was nothing legitimately offensive. The comedy rap group Starbomb paid homage to Glass Joe on the track "Glass Joe's Title Fight" on their 2014 album Player Select, which chronicles an ill fated fight between Joe and Mr. Sandman.

Difficulty
Glass Joe is considered noteworthy for his weakness. Writers have used him as a test of the usability of NES controllers such as the U-Force and the Power Glove. Hardcore Gamer's Nikola Suprak compared Glass Joe to the Super Mario enemy Goomba, which was featured alongside Glass Joe on a Nintendo Power list of their "favorite punching bags." GamesRadar editor Mikel Reparaz included him in his list of the "13 unluckiest videogame bastards" and gave respect to the fact that he never gives up.

His appearance in the "Title Defense" mode of the Wii Punch-Out!! received attention for his increased difficulty. Official Nintendo Magazines Chris Scullion praised the fight and felt it proved that the Wii game would not be too easy.

Notes

References

Fictional professional boxers
Fictional French people in video games
Fictional martial artists in video games
Male characters in video games
Male video game villains
Nintendo antagonists
Punch-Out!! characters
Video game bosses
Video game characters introduced in 1984
Fictional boxers